Elachista ripula is a moth of the family Elachistidae that can be found in Finland and northern Russia.

References

ripula
Moths described in 1998
Moths of Europe